Warren B. Douglass (January 25, 1886 - ?) was a state legislator in Illinois. A Republican, Ida B. Wells ran as an independent against him.

He married and had a child.

See also
List of African-American officeholders (1900-1959)

References

African-American state legislators in Illinois
Year of birth missing
Year of death missing
African-American men in politics
20th-century African-American politicians
20th-century American politicians